Marcelo Nuno Duarte Rebelo de Sousa  (born 12 December 1948) is a Portuguese politician and academic. He is the 20th and current president of Portugal, since 9 March 2016. He is a member of the Social Democratic Party, though he suspended his party membership for the duration of his presidency. Rebelo de Sousa has previously served as a government minister, parliamentarian in the Assembly of the Portuguese Republic, legal scholar, journalist, political analyst, law professor, and pundit.

Early life
Born in Lisbon, Rebelo de Sousa is the eldest son of Baltasar Rebelo de Sousa (1921–2001) and his wife Maria das Neves Fernandes Duarte (1921–2003). He has claimed that his mother had Jewish ancestry. He is named after his godfather, Marcello Caetano, the last prime minister of the Estado Novo regime.

Rebelo de Sousa became a professor and publicist specialized in constitutional law and administrative law, earning his doctorate at the University of Lisbon, where he taught law.

Party politics and academic career
Rebelo de Sousa started his career during the Estado Novo as a lawyer, and later as a journalist. He joined the Popular Democratic Party, becoming a Deputy to the Assembly of the Republic. During that time, he helped draft Portugal's constitution in 1976. Later he rose to Minister of Parliamentary Affairs under Prime Minister Francisco Pinto Balsemão. Together with him he was a co-founder, Director and Administrator of the Expresso newspaper, owned by Pinto Balsemão. He was also a founder of Sedes. He worked with another newspaper, Semanário, between 1983 and 1987. He started as a political analyst and pundit on the radio broadcaster TSF with his Exams, in which he gave marks (0 to 20) to the main political players.

In 1989 he ran for President of the Municipal Chamber of Lisbon (Mayor of Lisbon) but lost to Jorge Sampaio, though he did win a seat as City Councilor (Vereador). In that campaign he took a plunge into the waters of the Tagus River to prove they were not polluted despite claims to the contrary. In other local elections, he also became the President of the Municipal Assembly of Cascais (1979–1982) and the President of the Municipal Assembly of Celorico de Basto (1997–2009).

Leader of the PSD, 1996–1999
Rebelo de Sousa was the leader of the Social Democratic Party from 29 March 1996 to 27 May 1999. He created a center-right coalition, the Democratic Alliance, with the People's Party in 1998. He became, however, the Vice-President of the European People's Party–European Democrats. The coalition did not please large parts of its own party, due to the role the People's Party leader, Paulo Portas, had in undermining Aníbal Cavaco Silva's government while director of the weekly O Independente.

Post-leadership
He had a weekly program of political analysis every Sunday on public TV station RTP after previously having a similar program on the private TV station TVI. President Jorge Sampaio dissolved the Assembly of the Republic, a move that also meant dismissing the Government at a time when it had a stable coalition majority, and calling for anticipated elections, which led to the defeat of Santana Lopes and the election of the Socialists under José Sócrates.

In 2010, he left RTP and returned to TVI to do the same program that he had before.

He was made a Member of the Council of State, by President Aníbal Cavaco Silva, and was sworn in on 6 April 2006.

He was a leading figure on the anti-abortion side of the 2007 abortion referendum. He even founded a website titled "Assim Não" (Not like this), which was divulged with a famous introductory video. It became so well known that it was parodied in Saturday Night Live-fashion by famous humour group Gato Fedorento.

President of Portugal, 2016–present

On 24 January 2016, Rebelo de Sousa was elected as President of Portugal in the first round of voting. He stood as an independent, appealing for moderation and cross-party consensus. During his election campaign, he promised to repair political divisions and the hardship of Portugal's 2011–14 bailout. Unlike his predecessor, Aníbal Cavaco Silva, he had never previously held a top state position.

In March 2020, Rebelo de Sousa asked parliament to authorize a state of emergency to contain the COVID-19 pandemic; this marked the first time the country declared a state of emergency nationwide in 46 years of democratic history.

In December 2020, Rebelo de Sousa announced his intention to run for office again in the 2021 Portuguese presidential election. Marcelo was re-elected president in January 2021, with 60.7% of the votes, the third highest vote margin ever in presidential elections in Portugal since the Carnation Revolution. He was also the first candidate ever to win the vote in all municipalities, ranging from 51.3% in the Beja District to 72.16% in Madeira.

State visits

Rebelo de Sousa, as President of Portugal, has visited the Vatican, Spain, Mozambique, Morocco, Brazil, Switzerland, Cuba, United Kingdom, Greece, United States of America and Angola. The first visit was to the Vatican City to meet the Pope Francis and the Cardinal Secretary of State Pietro Parolin.  In 2019, he joined President Emmanuel Macron for the traditional Bastille Day military parade in Paris, which honoured European military cooperation and the European Intervention Initiative that year.

Health
In December 2017, Rebelo de Sousa underwent emergency surgery at Curry Cabral Hospital in order to treat an incarcerated umbilical hernia. The procedure was performed by Eduardo Barroso, a friend of the president. He was discharged from the hospital and lauded the Portuguese National Health Service, considering it an important achievement of Portuguese democracy.

In June 2018, Rebelo de Sousa was briefly hospitalized after he collapsed after a visit to Bom Jesus do Monte sanctuary in Braga; the incident was caused by a sudden drop in blood pressure alongside acute gastroenteritis.

In October 2019, he underwent planned cardiac catheterization at Santa Cruz Hospital, Carnaxide, in the outskirts of Lisbon, after accumulated calcium was detected in one of his blood vessels.

On 8 March 2020, Rebelo de Sousa suspended all his public agenda and returned to his private home in Cascais, entering a voluntary quarantine period for 14 days after being revealed that a group of students from Felgueiras, who had visited Belém Palace some days before, had also been quarantined after a positive case of COVID-19 was detected in their school. Marcelo subsequently tested negative for the virus and worked remotely for a period during the COVID-19 pandemic.

On 11 January 2021, Rebelo de Sousa tested positive for COVID-19, after a contact with a positive case in his staff. He was reportedly asymptomatic, and canceled his appointments, opting to remain in self-isolation. Three further COVID-19 tests yielded  negative results. Some physicians said that a false positive PCR-RT test, although possible, was unlikely, and tentatively attributed the subsequent negative tests to a low viral load. On 13 January, however, the Lisbon and Tagus Valley regional public health authority confirmed that the President was considered to have had a low-risk exposure, and was therefore simply under passive surveillance for two weeks: the President was instructed that he could resume his agenda save for any events in crowded public places.

In December 2021, he underwent planned surgery to remove two inguinal hernias at the Military Hospital in Lisbon.

Personal life
On 27 July 1972, Rebelo de Sousa married Ana Cristina da Gama Caeiro da Mota Veiga in the parish of São Bento do Mato in Évora. His wife, born on 4 June 1950 in the Santos-o-Velho parish of Lisbon, is the daughter of António da Mota Veiga and Maria Emília da Gama Caeiro. In the following years, Sousa and Mota Veiga had two children: 
 Nuno da Mota Veiga Rebelo de Sousa (b. São Sebastião da Pedreira, Lisbon, 8 August 1973) and
 Sofia da Mota Veiga Rebelo de Sousa (b. São Sebastião da Pedreira, Lisbon, 27 September 1976).
The couple separated in 1980 but never got divorced, with Sousa citing his Roman Catholic faith as the reason behind his wish to keep up the marital bond. He started dating his former student Rita Amaral Cabral in 1981, who at the time was his fellow lecturer at the Faculty of Law of the University of Lisbon. They continue to entertain a casual relationship, but live separately.

Honours and awards

National orders

Insignia of Office 

 Grand Master of the Honorific Orders of Portugal (2016 – present)

Personal orders 
 Grand Collar of the Military Order of the Tower and Sword (9 March 2021)
 Grand Cross of the Order of Prince Henry (9 June 2005)
 Commander of the Order of Saint James of the Sword (9 June 1994)

Foreign orders
 Grand Collar of the Order of Timor-Leste (19 May 2022)
 Recipient of the Order of Agostinho Neto (6 March 2019)
 Grand Star of the Decoration of Honour for Services to the Republic of Austria (18 June 2019)
 Grand Cordon of the Order of Leopold (22 October 2018)
 Grand Cross of the Order of the Balkan Mountains (30 January 2019)
 1st Class of the Amílcar Cabral Order (10 April 2017)
 Collar of the Order of Merit (30 March 2017)
 Grand Collar of the Order of Boyaca (13 November 2017)
 Grand Cross of the Grand Order of King Tomislav of the Republic of Croatia (4 May 2018)
 Grand Collar of the Order of Makarios III (8 October 2022)
 Collar of the Order of the Nile (21 November 2016)
 Collar of the Order of the Cross of Terra Mariana (10 April 2019)
 Grand Cross of the Legion of Honour of the French Republic (26 August 2016)
 Grand Cross of the Order of the Redeemer of Greece (21 April 2017)
 Grand Cross with Chain of the Order of Merit of the Republic of Hungary (23 February 2023)
 Knight Grand Cross with Cordon of the Order of Merit of the Italian Republic (29 November 2017)
 Grand Cross of the National Order of the Ivory Coast (2017)
 Knight (single order) of the Order of the Gold Lion of the House of Nassau of the Grand Duchy of Luxembourg (23 May 2017)
 Honorary Companion of Honour with Collar of The National Order of Merit of the Republic of Malta (15 May 2018)
 Member Special Class of the Order of Muhammad of the Kingdom of Morocco (27 June 2016)
 Collar of the Order of the Aztec Eagle (17 July 2017)
 Knight Grand Cross of the Order of the Netherlands Lion of the Kingdom of the Netherlands (10 October 2017)
 Collar of the National Order of Merit (Paraguay) (11 May 2017)
 Grand Cross with diamonds of the Order of the Sun of Peru (25 February 2019)
 Grand Cross of the Order of the Republic of Serbia (25 January 2017)
 Recipient of the Order for Exceptional Merits (Slovenia) (31 May 2021)
 Knight of the Collar of the Order of Isabella the Catholic of the Kingdom of Spain (25 November 2016)
 Collar of the Order of Charles III of the Kingdom of Spain (13 April 2018)
 Knight with the Collar of the Order of Pius IX of the Vatican City State (Vatican, 7 July 2016)

References

 Costados Alentejanos, II, António Luís de Torres Cordovil Pestana de Vasconcelos, Edição do Author, Évora 2006, N.º 41

External links

 Marcelo Nuno Duarte Rebelo de Sousa's genealogy in a Portuguese genealogical site

|-

|-

|-

1948 births
Collars of the Order of Isabella the Catholic
Grand Croix of the Légion d'honneur
Living people
Members of the Assembly of the Republic (Portugal)
People from Lisbon
Portuguese Roman Catholics
Presidents of Portugal
Social Democratic Party (Portugal) politicians
University of Lisbon alumni
Recipients of the Collar of the Order of the Cross of Terra Mariana
Recipients of the Grand Star of the Decoration for Services to the Republic of Austria
Recipients of the Order of the Tower and Sword
Recipients of the Order of Timor-Leste